Blue Blood (or Aghazadeh) is an Iranian Drama and Crime. The series is producer and written by Hamed Angha and directed by Behrang Tofighi in 29 episodes.

Storyline 
"Aghazadeh" series in the genre of social and political drama is the story of an Aghazadeh named Nima Bahri (Amir Aghaei) who has committed economic violations and an agent named Hamed Tehrani (Sina Mehrad) who is also an Aghazadeh, of course, with completely opposite characteristics, tries to expose Nima.

Cast 
 Pardis Pourabedini
Sina Mehrad
 Amir Aghaei
 Amin Tarokh
 Mehdi Soltani
 Amin Hayai
 Niki Karimi
 Kambiz Dirbaz
 Jamshid Hashempour
 Laya Zanganeh
 Soraya Ghasemi
 Diba Zahedi
 Mohammad Hossein Latifi
 Mehdi Koushki
Alireza vatan parast 
 Kaveh Khodashenas
 Saeed Dakh

Masoud Forotan
 Samieh Lak
 Rozbeh Moeini
 Ehsan Amanai
 Akbar Rahmati
 Majid Esmaeili

Reception

Awards and nominations

References

External links
 
 Aghazadeh at Filimo

2010s Iranian television series
Iranian drama television series